Baltamakhi (Dargwa: Балтамахьи) is a rural locality (a selo) in Kichi-Gamrinsky Rural Settlement, Sergokalinsky District, Republic of Dagestan, Russia. The population was 398 as of 2010. There is 1 street.

Geography 
Baltamakhi is located 32 km southeast of Sergokala (the district's administrative centre) by road. Kichi-Gamri and Mamaaul are the nearest rural localities.

Nationalities 
Dargins live there.

References 

Rural localities in Sergokalinsky District